South Pasadena Unified School District is the school district serving South Pasadena, California, United States. The South Pasadena Middle School was the site of a congressional debate in 1946 between Rep. Jerry Voorhis and then unknown Navy veteran Richard Nixon. Nixon won the debate according to most observers and upset Voorhis in the November election.

South Pasadena Unified School District's Board of Education members are elected at-large, composed of five members. Elections were held in November of odd-numbered years, but effective in November 2018, elections will be held in November of even-numbered years.

Schools

Primary

Marengo Elementary School

Marengo's mascot is the Lions.

Monterey Hills Elementary School
Mascot a roadrunner

Arroyo Vista Elementary School

Secondary
South Pasadena Middle School (Junior High)
South Pasadena High School
References
South Pasadena Middle School is 424,725 sq ft(estimated).

Governance 
South Pasadena Unified School District is governed by a five-member Board of Education, which appoints a superintendent, who runs the daily operations of the district. Members of the board are elected at large directly by voters in even-numbered years to staggered four-year terms. The district's current superintendent is Dr. Geoff Yantz. The five current members of the Board of Education include Board President Dr. Michele Kipke, Board Clerk Dr. Ruby Kalra, Dr. Suzie Abajian, Jon Primuth, and Zahir Robb.

References

External links
 

School districts in Los Angeles County, California